Stanislav Yuryevich Donets (born 7 July 1983) is a Russian swimmer from Dimitrovgrad. He was the world record holder for the 100m backstroke (Short Course).

See also 
 World record progression 100 metres backstroke

References 

1983 births
Living people
Russian male swimmers
Male backstroke swimmers
World record holders in swimming
Swimmers at the 2008 Summer Olympics
Olympic swimmers of Russia
Jewish swimmers
Medalists at the FINA World Swimming Championships (25 m)
European Aquatics Championships medalists in swimming
People from Dimitrovgrad, Russia
Sportspeople from Ulyanovsk Oblast